The following radio stations broadcast at 89.2 MHz.

China 
 CNR Music Radio in Zhangjiajie
 CNR The Voice of China in Lhasa

Sri Lanka
Lite 89.2

Turkey
Radyo 3 at Adana

United Kingdom
BBC Radio 2

References

Lists of radio stations by frequency